Wei Yi (born 2 June 1999) is a Chinese chess grandmaster.

Wei became a grandmaster at the age of 13 years, 8 months and 23 days, the 9th youngest in history. He is the youngest player ever to reach a rating of 2700, accomplishing this feat at age 15. Wei represents the Jiangsu club in the China Chess League.

Career

Early years

In 2007, he competed in the Chinese Chess Championship B group at the age of 8, recording a draw against Grandmaster Zhou Jianchao.

In 2009, Wei Yi won the under 11 section of the 5th World School Chess Championship, held in Thessaloniki, Greece.

In 2010, he won the under-12 event at the Asian Youth Chess Championship and followed this up by winning the same division at the World Youth Chess Championship.

2012

In August, he won his first GM norm at the World Junior Chess Championship in Athens, including a victory over Richárd Rapport and a draw with the eventual winner Alexander Ipatov; when Wei was only 12.  The competition is open to participants under-20 at 1 January.

In October, he gained his second GM norm at the Indonesian Open Chess Championship, with victories over Michał Krasenkow and Sergey Fedorchuk.

2013

In February, he secured his final norm at the Reykjavik Open with a score of 7½/10, including a victory over Maxime Vachier-Lagrave, finishing 6th.

In August, he made his debut at the FIDE World Cup, held that year in Tromsø, being one of the FIDE president's nominees. He defeated Ian Nepomniachtchi in the first round and Alexei Shirov in the second, then was knocked out by Shakhriyar Mamedyarov in the third round.

On the November FIDE rating list, Wei, aged 14 years, four months and 30 days, reached a rating of 2604, thus becoming the youngest player in history to achieve a rating above 2600, breaking the record held by Wesley So. This record has since been broken by John M. Burke.

2014

In June, Wei won the 27th Magistral de León rapid tournament by defeating Francisco Vallejo Pons in the final.

In August, he played on the reserve board for China in the 41st Chess Olympiad in Tromsø. He scored 4/5, helping the Chinese team to win the gold medal.

In October he finished second in the World Junior Championship in Pune, India behind Lu Shanglei.

2015

In January, he won the Challenger Group at the Tata Steel Chess Tournament with a score of 10½/13 (+8-0=5) and a rating performance of 2804, ahead of David Navara and without any defeat. By doing so, he qualified for the Masters section in 2016.

In February, he competed in the Gibraltar Masters tournament and finished in a share of 3rd–11th. This boosted Wei's rating to 2706 in the March rating list, making Wei Yi the youngest player ever to cross the 2700 mark. The record had previously been held by Magnus Carlsen.

In April, Wei took part in the World Team Chess Championship, which was won by the Chinese team. Wei scored 7/9 (+5=4-0) and won the gold medal on board 4.

In May, Wei won the Chinese Championship, beating Ding Liren, Wang Hao and Yu Yangyi to the title and in the process becoming the youngest Chinese chess champion ever.

In June, he won his second consecutive Magistral de León rapid tournament, defeating Maxime Vachier-Lagrave in the final.

At the Chess World Cup 2015, Wei sequentially knocked out Saleh Salem, Yuri Vovk, Alexander Areshchenko, and compatriot Ding Liren to progress to the quarterfinals, becoming the youngest player in the Chess World Cup history to accomplish this. Then he lost to Peter Svidler in the second set of rapid tiebreakers (10'+10") and therefore was eliminated from the competition.

In the inaugural edition of the China Chess King Match, held in Taizhou, Zhejiang and featuring most of the top Chinese players, Wei Yi sequentially knocked out Zhao Jun, Yu Yangyi and Bu Xiangzhi to win the event. The format of this event was identical to that of the Chess World Cup.

2016

In January, Wei Yi played in the Tata Steel Chess Tournament Masters section, for which he qualified by winning the Challengers section in 2015. He finished seventh out of fourteen participants with a score of 6½/13.

In April, Wei Yi won the Chinese Chess Championship for the second time in his career, scoring 7.5/11 (+4 =5 -0).

Wei played in the Bilbao Chess Masters Final in July, which included five players from the world's top 10: Wesley So, Hikaru Nakamura, Anish Giri, the world title challenger Sergey Karjakin and the world champion Magnus Carlsen. Wei won against Giri playing with white, lost against eventual winner Carlsen playing with black and drew all other games, finishing with a score of +1 =8 -1 to take third place.

2017
In January, Wei Yi participated again in the annual traditional Tata Steel Tournament finishing fifth.

In May, Wei Yi won the Chinese championship for the third time in a row with a score of 8½/11 (+6 =5 -0).

In July, he won his first super-tournament at the 8th Danzhou Super-GM event ahead of the likes of Ding Liren, Vassily Ivanchuk and Yu Yangyi with 6½/9, a full point clear of the field.

2018
In December, Wei Yi won the Asian Continental Championship in Makati, the Philippines. He scored 6½/9 points and took the title on tiebreak from M.Amin Tabatabaei and Lê Quang Liêm. Thanks to this achievement Wei also qualified for the FIDE World Cup 2019.

2019
In December 2019, Wei Yi reached the finals of the fourth stage of the prestigious FIDE Grand Prix 2019 Tournament (after outplaying David Navara in the semi-finals on tie-breaks), losing to Ian Nepomniachtchi.

Notable games 
Wei Yi vs Lazaro Bruzon Batista, 6th Hainan Danzhou (2015). This has been described as "Game of the Decade", with a king walk reminiscent of the famous 1912 game between Edward Lasker and Sir George Thomas.
Wei Yi vs. Anne Haast, Tata Steel Group B (2015)
Wei Yi vs. Alexei Shirov, World Cup 2013
Wei Yi vs. Sergey Karjakin, Tata Steel-Masters 2017

Personal life
In 2018, Wei enrolled as a student at the Tsinghua University School of Economics and Management.

References

External links
 
 
 
 

1999 births
Living people
Chinese chess players
Chess grandmasters
World Youth Chess Champions
Chess players from Jiangsu
People from Yancheng